Sargis Tmogveli or Sargis of Tmogvi was a 12th-13th century Georgian statesman and writer active during the reign of Queen Tamar ( 1184-1213). Sargis, son of Varam, belonged to the Tmogveli branch of the powerful Mkhargrdzeli family and owned estates in Tmogvi.

Tmogveli rendered the old Iranian love story Vīs and Rāmīn (written by Fakhruddin As'ad Gurgani) into Georgian prose; this Georgian version of the Persian original became known as Visramiani.

Biography 
During a revolt of Queen Tamar's disgraced husband, George the Rus', around 1191, Sargis was one of the few nobles who remained loyal to the queen. For this he was kindly rewarded; he was given Tmogvi to secure frontier borders in Javakheti. In 1195 he participated in the Battle of Shamkor. In the 1200s, Shalva and Sargis Tmogveli, commanded the Georgian troops during the victorious campaign against Kars. In 1203 he fought in a campaign in the country of Dvin.

References

Sources 
 
 
 Shoshiashvili, N., Georgian Soviet Encyclopedia, vol. 4, p. 687-688. Tbilisi, 1979

Politicians from Georgia (country)
12th-century people from Georgia (country)
House of Mkhargrdzeli
13th-century people from Georgia (country)
Translators from Persian